Abraham Pierre Tony Luteyn (10 February 1917 – 9 February 2003) was a Dutch officer who successfully escaped from the German prisoner of war camp of Colditz. Sometimes he is referred to as Anthony Luteyn.

Start of World War II 
Luteyn was born at Batavia, Dutch East Indies.

At the outbreak of World War II in the Netherlands, Luteyn was a cadet of the Royal Netherlands East Indies Army (Koninklijk Nederlands Indisch Leger, KNIL) at the Dutch military academy (Koninklijke Militaire Academie, KMA).

After the capitulation of the Dutch armed forces, all officers and cadets were asked to give their word of honour not to harm German interests in any way as long as the Netherlands and Germany were at war. When they gave their word of honour they could go home and live relatively free.

Luteyn refused, together with about 60 other officers, cadets and one rating of the Dutch navy (stoker Willem de Lange). The officers refusing did so for various reasons. Some did not give their word because they saw it as conflicting with their officer's oath. The majority of officers who didn't give their word of honour were officers of the Royal Netherlands East Indies Army, arguing that according to their regulations it was forbidden to give their word of honour and because the Dutch East Indies were still free at that time, they saw it as their duty to remain in the fight.

All final year cadets were commissioned just before they were led into captivity. Luteyn was thus commissioned as a 2nd lieutenant of engineers in the Royal Netherlands East Indies Army. Because their commission was given hastily and without much ceremony they were dubbed "kasian lieutenant" (Malay for pity lieutenants).

Prisoner of war 
Luteyn and all other Dutch officers and cadets who had refused to give their word of honour were thus led into captivity. On 16 July 1940 they were led to their first POW camp Soest Oflag VI A. From this camp the first Dutch escape attempt was made by lieutenant Hans Larive, Royal Netherlands Navy. Larive was caught at the Swiss border near Gottmadingen / Singen but this escape attempt proved to be vital for many future escapes.

After Larive was caught, he was interrogated by a local Gestapo officer. In 1940, Germany was still in an overconfident mood, and the Gestapo officer told Larive where he went wrong and what he should have done to cross the border successfully. Many officers, including Larive himself and Luteyn, later used this information to cross the border successfully.

In November 1940 the group was moved to Juliusburg Oflag VIII C in Amalienstift, an old convent. The convent was partly used as POW camp and part was still in use as an orphanage. From this camp the first successful escape was made by captain John Trebels and lieutenant Frans van der Veen, who also used the Gottmadingen–Singen border crossing. As other officers were also busy with escape attempts which could interfere with each other, Captain Machiel van den Heuvel was appointed as escape officer.

Colditz 

After the successful escape by Trebels and van der Veen, the Dutch officers were moved in July 1941 to the POW camp for "special prisoners", sonderlager Oflag IV-C Colditz.  
At this moment there were Polish, British, French and Belgian POWs in Colditz. Escape attempts before the Dutch arrived were made. Few were successful, amongst which were the escapes by French Lieutenants Pierre Mairesse Lebrun and Alain le Ray.
In August and September 1941, only one month after arriving in Colditz, the Dutch could claim two successful escapes during which four Dutch officers (naval lieutenants Hans Larive and Flanti Steinmetz, major C. Giebel and 2nd Lieutenant O. Drijber) escaped to Switzerland.

On 5 January 1942 Luteyn made his successful escape together with British lieutenant Airey Neave. Neave was the first British officer to make it back to Britain from Colditz. In December 1941 the British had discovered a way of escape for two officers dressed in German uniforms. From the third floor from the saalhouse and the theater they had made a hole in the floor which gave an entrance to the attic above the guardroom. As they needed an officer who could speak fluent German, the British asked the Dutch to work together.

Luteyn and Airey Neave were teamed together and on January 5, 1942, after evening roll call, they were led to the saalhouse by British escape officer Pat Reid and Canadian Howard Wardle. Both prospective escapers were dressed in three sets of clothes - first civilian clothes, second German uniform, thirdly their own uniform. Through the hole under the theater they were led to a tower in which they could reach the stairs to the guardroom. The two escapers had to wait a few minutes so Reid and Wardle had time to return to the theater and camouflage all traces of this escape. Luteyn and Neave cleaned and checked their German uniforms and proceeded downstairs to the German guards. Several guards sprang to attention when "lieutenants" Luteyn and Neave passed them. They went to the park because passing the final guard at the gate required needed identification, which they didn't have. The park, however, was lightly guarded, and there they climbed the wall without many problems.

After passing the wall they buried their German uniforms and went to Leisnig, where they took the early train to Leipzig. Targeting a cross into Switzerland via Hans Larive's Singen route, they had to wait for twelve hours before they could continue to Regensburg. To pass time they went to a local cinema. They reached Ulm through Regensburg and Augsburg; here they tried to buy a ticket to Engen, a village near Singen. The lady selling train tickets was suspicious and warned the local police. Luteyn and Neave were taken to the local police station and questioned. There they told their cover-story: as Dutchmen working for the Arbeitseinsatz. The police only half believed their story and brought them to the local Arbeitseinsatz building to check their story. In this building they escaped and walked 40 km to Biberach, where they took a train to Stockach, from which they could walk the final km to Singen.

Travelling for three days and living on a few pieces of chocolate and sucking snowballs as drinking water, they got tired. They were discovered again by workers and fled and hid in an empty garden shack. Here they tried to sleep on a small bench. When they wanted to leave they discovered their shoes were frozen to the floor; they had to defrost them with their breath. They took a spade and axe to look like local workers. On the evening of the fourth day they reached the Swiss border. As a police car was checking the local border posts they could clearly see them. They picked their position and decided to cross the border running. They shook hands and wished each other luck. Running with bleeding blisters and falling and stumbling through snow-covered holes, they reached the village of Ramsen in Switzerland.

Post-escape 
After his successful escape, Luteyn wrote to Captain van den Heuvel about his escape and where to look out, all in code obviously. He went to Suriname (a Dutch colony at that time) and went to Australia to join the remainder of the Dutch East Indies army there. For his successful escape, Luteyn was awarded the bronze cross in 1943.
Airey Neave joined MI9 and became a famous member of parliament.
After the successful escape by Luteyn and Neave, another British Dutch couple (Hyde Thompson and Donkers) tried to escape on 6 January 1942. They successfully got out of the castle but had the misfortune to get the same ticket-sales-lady as Luteyn and Neave in Ulm. They got arrested and were returned to Colditz.

References 
Leo de Hartog: Officieren achter prikkeldraad 1940–1945. Uitgeverij Hollandia, Baarn, 1983.  (page 157-159).
Reinhold Eggers: Colditz, the German story. London, Hale, 1961.  (ed. 1991), Dutch translation: Amsterdam, 1974.
onderscheidingen.nl

1917 births
2003 deaths
Royal Netherlands East Indies Army personnel
Royal Netherlands East Indies Army personnel of World War II
Prisoners of war held at Colditz Castle
Dutch escapees
Escapees from German detention
Dutch prisoners of war in World War II
People from Batavia, Dutch East Indies
Graduates of the Koninklijke Militaire Academie